Ab Gol (also Romanized as Āb Gol) is a village in Zilayi Rural District, Margown District, Boyer-Ahmad County, Kohgiluyeh and Boyer-Ahmad Province, Iran. At the 2006 census, its population was 97, in 17 families.

References 

Populated places in Boyer-Ahmad County